The Tecumseh Opera House, located at 123 S. Third in Tecumseh, Nebraska, is a historic building built in 1880.  It is a two-part commercial block building, and has also been known as Seaver Bros. Opera House, as Smith Theatre, as Hahn Opera House, as Spicknall & Goodman Opera House, as Goodman & Canfield Opera House, and as Villars Hall, and it has been denoted NeHBS #J007-53 and OHBIN #ll-29-OI.

It was listed on the National Register of Historic Places in 1988.  It was deemed significant as a well-preserved example of an opera house building in Nebraska.

The building 

The Tecumseh Opera House is a brick structure measures 76 feet wide by 80 feet wide. The roof is pitched and tar-covered and has sustained significant water damage, but it was repaired. Access to the second-floor auditorium is only by way of a wide staircase, at the top the ticket counter that was there has been removed.

The auditorium of the Tecumseh Opera House stands 30 feet wide by 60 feet, 6 inches long. The theatre does not have a balcony. The original molded white tin ceiling is still there, however it and the surrounding walls have experienced rain damage. The proscenium arch spans 20 feet across and 11 feet high. The stage floor is 18 feet deep from the beginning of the arch at the front of the stage to the back wall. The stage has no apron and contains no trap doors.

The structural and historical integrity of the building has been preserved.

Significance

Performing arts 

The Tecumseh Opera House brought a variety of entertainment to the people of Tecumseh and the surrounding areas. As a center for the performing arts, the Tecumseh Opera House, was home to productions such as musical concerts, touring stock companies, performers such as Maude Atkinson, Katie Putnam, and John Dillon, classics such as Monte Cristo, Uncle Tom's Cabin, and East Lynn, minstrel shows such as the Tecumseh Ticklers, grand and comic opera, dialect comedies, and home talent shows.

Performing Arts History

Entertainment/recreation 

The Tecumseh Opera House served as a place where the whole community of Tecumseh and the surrounding areas would be able to gather to attend dances, lectures, temperance meetings, and silent movies.

Entertainment/recreation history

Social 
The Tecumseh Opera House was a nonaffiliated place where people could have political meetings, church socials, basketball, and school entertainment. Before radio and television were invented to tell people about events, they were often scheduled and anticipated months in advance.

Social history

References

External links 
More photos of the Tecumseh Opera House at Wikimedia Commons

Theatres on the National Register of Historic Places in Nebraska
Theatres completed in 1880
Johnson County, Nebraska
Theatres in Nebraska
National Register of Historic Places in Johnson County, Nebraska
Opera houses on the National Register of Historic Places in Nebraska
Opera houses in Nebraska